Daria Sergeyevna Nagornaya (née Spiridonova  ; born 8 July 1998) is a Russian former artistic gymnast. Primarily an uneven bars specialist, she is the 2015 World Champion, the 2015 European Champion, the 2014 World bronze medalist, and a four-time Russian national (2014–17) champion on the apparatus. She represented Russia at the 2016 Summer Olympics, winning a silver medal in the team competition. She was also a member of the gold-medal-winning team at the 2016 European Championships, the silver-medal-winning teams at the 2018 and 2019 World Championships, and the bronze-medal-winning teams at the 2014 World and 2014 European championships. She is married to Russian gymnast Nikita Nagornyy.

Junior career 
Spiridonova made her international debut at the 2012 Pre-Olympic Youth Cup in Bergisch-Gladbach, Germany, where she won the all-around gold medal.

2013 was Spiridonova's breakout year. She took gold with her team and silver on uneven bars at the Russian Junior Championships in the spring. She competed at the Olympic Hopes, winning gold with her team and on uneven bars, bronze in the all-around, and placing fifth on vault. She went on to compete at the KSI Cup, winning team and all-around gold medals.

Senior career

2014 
Spiridonova's senior debut came at the 2014 Cottbus World Cup, but she did not make the event finals. She then competed at the Russian Championships in April, winning gold on bars, silver with her team and on balance beam, and placing fifth in the all-around, and seventh on floor.

At the 2014 European Championships, Spiridonova competed on uneven bars, balance beam and floor exercise. She scored 14.900 on uneven bars which qualified her to the event finals in 4th place. She also scored a 14.058 on beam and 11.900 on floor after a fall. In the team final, Spiridonova contributed scores of 15.066 on bars, 12.300 on beam and 13.100 on floor towards the Russian team's bronze medal finish.

Individually, she won the bronze medal in the uneven bars final with a score of 15.283. On 29 October she placed first ahead of Larisa Iordache at the Arthur Gander Memorial, her first international win at the senior level. Days later, she partnered up with male Russian gymnast Nikita Ignatyev to win her second international title at the Swiss cup. At the Massila Master, she claimed the first all-around crown of her career.

2015
Spiridonova competed at the 2015 Russian Championships in Penza, Russia on 2–8 March 2015. She won a silver medal with her team, as well as placing 4th in the all around, winning gold on the uneven bars, and silver on the balance beam.

Due to her strong performance, Spiridonova was selected to compete at the 2015 European Championships in Montpellier, France on 15–19 April. She placed 13th in the all around final after complications on beam and floor, and she won the gold medal on the uneven bars, beating out the reigning European UB champion, Becky Downie, by 0.2.

At the 2015 World Gymnastics Championships in Glasgow, Spiridonova became a World Champion on the uneven bars, together with three other gymnasts who were part of a four-way tie.

2016

Spiridonova competed at the 2016 Russian Artistic Gymnastics Championships in Penza, Russia from 28 March-10 April 2016. She won a silver medal with her team and tied for gold on the uneven bars with Daria Skrypnik. At the conclusion of the National Championships, Spiridonova, along with Aliya Mustafina, Angelina Melnikova, Seda Tutkhalyan, and Ksenia Afanasyeva, was selected to compete for Russia at the 2016 European Championships in Bern, Switzerland on 1–5 June. She helped Russia qualify in 2nd place with a score of 173.261 and finished in 4th on the uneven bars with a score of 14.733. Despite the 2-per-country rule, she did replace teammate Melnikova in the uneven bars final because of her strength on the event. In the Team Final, she contributed to a 15.333 on uneven bars to lead Russia to a first-place finish with an overall score of 175.212. She won the silver medal on the uneven bars, losing to the 2014 UB Champion, Great Britain's Becky Downie by 0.034. Her teammate Mustafina won the bronze.

At the 2016 Russian Cup, Spridonova finished 4th with her team and won bronze on the uneven bars. At the conclusion of the Russian Cup, Spiridonova, along with Mustafina, Tutkhalyan, Melnikova, and Maria Paseka, was selected to represent Russia at the 2016 Summer Olympics in Rio de Janeiro, Brazil. In the midst of the Team Russia Doping Scandal, both the men's and women's gymnastics teams were cleared to compete days before the Games began.

At the 2016 Olympic Games, Spiridonova helped Russia qualify into the Team Finals in 3rd place with an overall score of 174.620. She also qualified into the Uneven Bars final in 4th place with a score of 15.683 along with Mustafina. In the team final, she contributed to a 15.100 on uneven bars to lead Russia to a silver medal with an overall score of 176.688. In the uneven bars final, she fell on one of her transition skills and finished in 8th place with a score of 13.966.

2018
On October 17, Russia announced the team to compete at the 2018 World Championships and Spirdonova was chosen as the alternate. She received a silver medal with the team behind the USA and ahead of China.  On December 18, Spiridonova married fellow Russian gymnast Nikita Nagornyy.

2019
Spiridonova was out for the majority of the season due to a comminuted ankle fracture she sustained in late 2018.  In August she returned to competition at the Russian Cup where she only competed on uneven bars and balance beam.  She won gold on uneven bars, finishing ahead of 2019 Junior World Uneven Bars Champion Vladislava Urazova and 2019 European Games Uneven Bar Champion Angelina Melnikova.  Shortly after the conclusion of the Russian Cup Spiridonova was named to the nominative team for the 2019 World Championships alongside Melnikova, Lilia Akhaimova, Angelina Simakova (later replaced by Maria Paseka), Anastasia Agafonova, and Aleksandra Shchekoldina.

During qualifications at the World Championships she competed on the uneven bars and helped Russia qualify to the team final in third place behind the United States and China. Individually she qualified to the uneven bars final in second place behind reigning World Champion Nina Derwael of Belgium. Despite Valentina Rodionenko's, the head coach of the Russian Women's gymnastics team, low expectations for the team, they won the silver medal in the team final, with Spiridonova contributing the second highest uneven bars score of the day (behind Becky Downie of Great Britain).  During the uneven bars final Spiridonova finished in sixth place.

2020 
In late January Spiridonova was listed on a nominative roster that was released for the Melbourne World Cup, scheduled to take place on February 20.  While there she placed third on uneven bars behind Diana Varinska of the Ukraine and Georgia Godwin of Australia.  She later competed at the Baku World Cup; during qualifications she finished fourth on uneven bars and therefore qualified to the event finals.  However event finals were canceled due to the 2020 coronavirus outbreak in Azerbaijan.

2021 
On February 17, 2021 Spiridonova announced on her Instagram page that she retired from gymnastics.

Competitive history

References

External links
 
 Daria Spiridonova at sportgymrus.ru 
 
 
 

1998 births
Living people
Russian female artistic gymnasts
Gymnasts from Moscow
Medalists at the World Artistic Gymnastics Championships
Gymnasts at the 2016 Summer Olympics
Olympic gymnasts of Russia
Medalists at the 2016 Summer Olympics
Olympic silver medalists for Russia
Olympic medalists in gymnastics
Universiade medalists in gymnastics
World champion gymnasts
Universiade gold medalists for Russia
People from Novocheboksarsk
Medalists at the 2017 Summer Universiade
European champions in gymnastics